Gutu is a constituency represented in the Senate of Zimbabwe. It covers most of the Gutu district in Masvingo Province, and is one of six senatorial constituencies in the province.

The equivalent seats in the House of Assembly are:
 Gutu North
 Gutu South
 Gutu East
 Gutu West
 Gutu Central

In the 2008 election, the constituency elected MDC member Empire Makamure as senator, defeating General Vitalis Zvinavashe. Afterwards during the recount, Zvinavashe told other ZANU-PF candidates on April 23 that they needed to "accept the reality" that the MDC had won, and he stressed that the importance of preserving peace. He blamed Mugabe for the ZANU-PF candidates' defeat, saying that the people of Masvingo had rejected Mugabe and that the parliamentary candidates suffered as collateral damage.

References

Masvingo Province